= Harry Adriaans =

Dutch footballer (born 1938)

Personal information
- Full name: Harry Adriaans
- Date of birth: 17 March 1938 (age 88)
- Place of birth: Netherlands
- Position: Midfielder

Senior career*
| Years | Team | Apps | (Gls) |
| 1956–1957 | PSV | 3 | (0) |
- * Club domestic league appearances and goals

Harry Adriaans (born 17 March 1938) is a Dutch retired association football player who played for PSV Eindhoven as a midfielder from 1956 to 1957.
